Bath County High School can refer to either of the following US high schools:
Bath County High School (Kentucky) in Owingsville, Kentucky
Bath County High School (Virginia) in Hot Springs, Virginia